Thousand Guineas is the name of a number of different horse races:

1000 Guineas Stakes in Great Britain
1,000 Guineas Trial Stakes trial race for the 1000 Guineas Stakes in Great Britain
Thousand Guineas Prelude and The Thousand Guineas in Australia
Poule d'Essai des Pouliches also known as the "French 1,000 Guineas"
Irish 1,000 Guineas
American 1000 Guineas Stakes
New Zealand 1000 Guineas
German 1,000 Guineas